Moe Lake is a lake in Clay County, Minnesota, in the United States.

Moe Lake was named for Nels R. Moe, a pioneer farmer who settled there.

See also
List of lakes in Minnesota

References

Lakes of Minnesota
Lakes of Clay County, Minnesota